Barnard Gate is a hamlet about  east of Witney in Oxfordshire. It has a public house, the Boot Inn.

References

Hamlets in Oxfordshire
West Oxfordshire District